Malcolm Clarke may refer to:
Malcolm Clarke (zoologist) (1930–2013), British marine biologist
Malcolm Clarke (composer) (1943–2003), British composer
Malcolm Clarke (footballer) (1944–2004), Scottish footballer
Malcolm Clarke (film maker), English film maker
Malcolm Clarke (Neighbours), fictional character on the Australian soap opera Neighbours

See also
 Malcolm Clark, Australian musician
 Malcolm Clark (cricketer) (born 1929), South African cricketer
 Malcolm Clark (priest) (1905–2002), Dean of Edinburgh